Morse Micro is a Sydney-based developer of Wi-Fi HaLow microprocessors; chips that enable high data rates, with long range and low power consumption. Amongst all Wi-Fi HaLow systems on a chip, Morse Micro processors are reported to be the smallest, fastest, longest-range with lowest-power-use. 

The main application of the technology is machine-to-machine communications. With the Internet of things expected to extend to 30 billion devices by 2025, this represents a steeply growing number of users of the technology. The founders plan to be part of "expanding Wi-Fi so it can go into everything, every smoke alarm, every camera."  

The firm has its global HQ in Sydney, which is also its main base for R&D, with additional centres in India, China and the United States. As of 2022, Morse Micro was producing more semiconductors than any other Australian-based tech company.

Technology 

After eight years' development, the company's Wifi HalLow processor was reported to deliver 10 times the range of conventional Wi-Fi technology, and able to function for several years before needing battery change.

Data rates and range 
The microprocessor allows for a range of data rates, depending on the Modulation and Coding Scheme used. This can be as low as 150 kilobytes per second using MCS 10 with BPSK modulation, to a top rate of 4 Megabytes Per Second using MCS 9 at 256 Quadrature Amplitude Modulation. 

The chip uses low-bandwidth wireless network protocols, operating in the 1 GHz spectrum, while providing a communications range of 1,000 metres. In one field test, researchers found the technology could sustain high speed data transmission between a device placed by the north end of Sydney Harbour Bridge and a device across the harbour at Sydney Opera House. The company claims their chip provides 10 times the range, 100 times the area and 1000 times the volume of data offered by traditional wi-fi.

Connectivity and energy 
To enable networked communications between machines, a single Wi-Fi HaLow Access Point can securely connect up to 8,191 devices. Applications for the WiFi HaLow technology includes the Internet of things, which may include solutions for in the home (such as lighting, monitoring and smart door locks) and in industry (such as vehicle management, high-end security and supply chain asset tracking. Looking at its scalability, one American technical review made this assessment:That's ample capacity to connect every LED bulb, light switch, smart door lock, motorized window shade, thermostat, smoke detector, solar panel, security camera, or any imaginable smart-home device for the foreseeable future. Physically, the company's microchip is one-fifth the size of a traditional Wi-Fi processor. It uses very little energy, consuming a fraction of the power consumed by traditional chips, which is achieved by periodically waking and reporting. As such, the chips can operate for several years on a single coin-size battery. In 2020, the first generation of Morse Micro microchips went into production in Taiwan. The company has onshore design and fabrication of composite semiconductors in Australia, which has been assessed as a strategic capability.

As of late 2022, the market for Wi-Fi Ha Low products appeared to be expanding, from those developing industrial IoT in the Japanese market which, "deploy thousands of devices in warehouses which use sensors and actuators."

History 
"Wi-Fi was invented over 20 years ago in Australia and over that time we have seen it go into every laptop, phone and tablet, and all of that came from people in Australia. Today we are opening it up and expanding Wi-Fi so it can go into everything, every smoke alarm, every camera." — Andrew Terry, founder, speaking to The Sydney Morning Herald in 2017The founding partners of Morse Micro, Andrew Terry and Michael De Nil met while working for Broadcom Inc, the largest supplier of integrated circuits for communications. De Nil said they noticed that chips designed for phones and laptops were being used for machine-to-machine communication and "that wasn't working very well." They decided to create a new kind of microprocessor, specifically for the Internet of things.

Morse Micro Pty Ltd was established as a private company, limited by guarantee, in August 2016. The founders were later joined by several significant engineers, including:

 Professor Neil Weste the founder of Radiata Networks who had created the first 802.11a Wi-Fi chip 
 Dr. John O'Sullivan (engineer) radio astronomer who led the team who invented Wi-Fi at CSIRO in the 1980s 
 Dr. David Goodall, a design engineer at Radiata, which created the first commercial WiFi chip

By 2022, the company employed 150 people across Australia, the United States, China, India and the United Kingdom. The current focus of market expansion is Japan, through its Japanese investor MegaChips.

Investors 
The Australian Government provided the founders with seed funding in 2017 as they believed Morse Micro has the "first WiFi HaLow silicon chip that securely connects smart devices over long distances." It is reported to be the best-funded Wi-Fi HaLow technology companies, with large investors from Japan, the United States and a spread of Australian retirement funds.

Series A investment, 2019 
In May 2019, Series A funding was provided in by a suite of investors. These included the Clean Energy Innovation Fund and CSIRO Innovation Fund, part of the Australian scientific research agency credited with inventing Wi-Fi in 1997.Investment also came from American entrepreneur Ray Stata of Analog Devices, Blackbird Ventures, Main Sequence Ventures, Right Click Capital, Kim Jackson and her husband Scott Farquhar through Skip Capital, Lucy and Malcolm Turnbull; and Uniseed, the venture fund of UniSuper. This tranche totalled AUD42 million.

Series B investment 2022 
By September 2022 the company had announced its Series B round of AUD140 million, later extended to AUD170 million, attracting intense investor interest. The investment round was led by Japanese chip design and manufacturing giant MegaChips, with further investment from its incumbent investors, which is known to include several Australian superannuation groups, such as TelstraSuper, HESTA, Hostplus and NGS (managed by Blackbird Ventures) and UniSuper (managed by Uniseed).

References

External links
 

Network protocols
Machine to machine
Wireless communication systems
CSIRO people
Australian inventions
Wireless networking
Internet of things
Broadcom
Integrated circuits
IEEE 802.11